Stenocarpus trinervis is a species of rainforest tree in the family Proteaceae, endemic to New Caledonia.  It may grow to 20 metres in height. The timber is beautifully marked, suited to cabinet making.

References

Endemic flora of New Caledonia
trinervis